Dorseyville may refer to a location in the United States:

Dorseyville, Louisiana
Dorseyville, Maryland
Dorseyville, Pennsylvania